The 1908 Invercargill mayoral election was held on 29 April 1908 as part of that year's local elections.

Incumbent mayor William Benjamin Scandrett was re-elected for his fifth consecutive term, with a reduced majority. He defeated former mayor Duncan McFarlane.

Results
The following table gives the election results:

References

1908 elections in New Zealand
Mayoral elections in Invercargill